Abyssochrysos brasilianus is a species of sea snail, a marine gastropod mollusk in the family Abyssochrysidae.

Distribution
continental slope off southeastern Brazil

Description 
The maximum recorded shell length is 23.6 mm.

Habitat 
Minimum recorded depth is 620 m. Maximum recorded depth is 1540 m.

References

External links

 

brasilianus
Gastropods described in 1991